Benjamin Lewis (born 22 June 1977) is an English semi-professional footballer from Chelmsford, Essex, who plays for Isthmian League Division One South club Croydon Athletic.

Football career
Lewis formerly played professionally for both Southend United and Colchester United, before knee problems arose and ended his professional career. Following this, he has played for non-League teams Grays Athletic, Ford United, Chelmsford City, Heybridge Swifts, Welling United, Bishop's Stortford and Maidstone United.

Lewis made his debut for Margate in a pre-season friendly against Carlisle United on 17 July 2009 in which he also made his first appearance as captain for the club. He then joined Croydon Athletic in December 2009.

References

External links

1977 births
Living people
Sportspeople from Chelmsford
Association football defenders
English footballers
Colchester United F.C. players
Southend United F.C. players
Heybridge Swifts F.C. players
Chelmsford City F.C. players
Grays Athletic F.C. players
Redbridge F.C. players
Bishop's Stortford F.C. players
St Albans City F.C. players
Welling United F.C. players
Maidstone United F.C. players
Margate F.C. players
Croydon Athletic F.C. players
Thamesmead Town F.C. players
Brentwood Town F.C. players
English Football League players